is a former Japanese football player. He played for Japan national team.

Club career
Nishiyama was born on January 7, 1942. After graduating from Waseda University, he joined Toyoda Automatic Loom Works in 1964.

National team career
On March 3, 1964, when Nishiyama was a Waseda University student, he debuted for Japan national team against Singapore.

National team statistics

References

External links
 
 Japan National Football Team Database

1942 births
Living people
Waseda University alumni
Japanese footballers
Japan international footballers
Japan Soccer League players
Toyota Industries SC players
Association football defenders